LaSalle is a town in Essex County, Ontario, Canada. It is a bedroom community of the City of Windsor and part of the Windsor Census Metropolitan Area, and is located south of that city. LaSalle, along with Windsor, is the oldest French settlement area in Southwestern Ontario, and the oldest continually inhabited European settlement in Canada west of the Quebec border. The town was named for explorer René-Robert Cavelier, Sieur de La Salle. 

The current Town of Lasalle was originally incorporated as the Township of Sandwich West in 1861. A portion of the township incorporated as the Town of Lasalle in 1924, but was dissolved in 1959 and rejoined Sandwich West. In 1991, the Township changed its status to that of a Town and was renamed Lasalle. It is the second most populous municipality within Essex County after the Municipality of Lakeshore. The town's land area includes Fighting Island in the Detroit River at its western side. Fighting Island is privately owned by BASF, the world's largest chemical company.

Town features 
One of LaSalle's biggest events is the annual Strawberry Festival which takes place on the first weekend in June. The annual LaSalle Craft Beer Festival, put on by the Corporation of the Town of LaSalle, is another popular annual event that features a number of different types of beer, from popular brands to smaller microbreweries.

In LaSalle, there are two secondary schools for students: Sandwich Secondary School and St. Thomas of Villanova Catholic Secondary School. The elementary schools include Sacred Heart Elementary School, Legacy Oak Trail Public School, LaSalle Public School, Sandwich West Public School, School Monseigneur Augustin Caron, Legacy Grove Public School and Holy Cross Catholic Elementary School.

LaSalle also has its own small but growing bicycle trail network, the "LaSalle Trail", which links up to neighbouring Windsor's "Windsor Trail" network, allowing people to ride from Sandwich Secondary School all the way to Windsor's Riverfront Trail. The town has expressed interest and intentions to connect LaSalle (and indirectly, Windsor) to the Chrysler Canada Greenway by constructing a link to the Trans Canada Trail near Oldcastle.

The town also features the Vollmer Culture and Recreation Complex, home to the LaSalle Vipers, of the GOJHL and the LaSalle Sabres, of the OMHA. It is also home to the LaSalle Stompers, of the Ontario Soccer Association. The complex has multiple rooms for hosting of events, 2 arenas, an Olympic-sized pool and slide, outdoor skate park, soccer fields, and baseball diamonds.

Communities
Besides the urban area proper of LaSalle itself, the town of LaSalle comprises a number of villages and hamlets, including Delisle's Corners, Heritage Estates, Lukerville, Oliver and River Canard.

Demographics 

Notable people 
 Jeff Burrows - member of rock band The Tea Party; grew up in LaSalle
 Stuart Chatwood - member of rock band The Tea Party; grew up in LaSalle
 Pete Craig - former MLB player  
 Andy Delmore - former NHL player
 David Finch - comic book artist 
 Zack Kassian - NHL player
 Paul Lucier - Senator
 Jeff Martin - member of rock band The Tea Party; grew up in LaSalle
 Kylie Masse - competitive swimmer; a world champion and a world record holder in the 100 m backstroke; grew up in LaSalle
 Dalton Prout - NHL player
 Amanda Reason - former world record holder and Olympic swimmer
 Derek Wilkinson - former NHL player
 Luke Willson - former NFL tight end, Super Bowl Champion

See also
 List of townships in Ontario

References

External links

Towns in Ontario
Lower-tier municipalities in Ontario
Municipalities in Essex County, Ontario
Ontario populated places on the Detroit River